This is a list of fossiliferous stratigraphic units in Guyana.



List of fossiliferous stratigraphic units

See also 
 
 South American land mammal age
 List of fossiliferous stratigraphic units in Venezuela

References

Further reading 
 R. B. McConnell, D. M. Smith, and J. P. Berrange. 1969. Geological and geophysical evidence for a rift valley in the Guiana Shield. Geologie en Mijnbouw 48(2):189-199

.Guyana
 
Fossil
Fossil